The Overture, Scherzo and Finale in E major is a work for symphony orchestra by Robert Schumann.  It is his opus 52, and was written in 1841. Schumann originally considered it his second symphony. The Overture, Scherzo and Finale was received tepidly by critics, was revised in 1845 and published the next year, with a dedication to Johannes Verhulst.

Structure 
The work is in three movements:

Recordings

 John Eliot Gardiner conducting the Orchestre Révolutionnaire et Romantique
 Wolfgang Sawallisch conducting the Sächsische Staatskapelle Dresden
 Herbert von Karajan conducting the Berliner Philharmoniker
 Sir Georg Solti conducting the Wiener Philharmoniker
 Franz Konwitschny conducting the Gewandhausorchester Leipzig
 Carl Schuricht conducting the Orchestre de la Société des Concerts du Conservatoire
 Lawrance Collingwood conducting the London Symphony Orchestra, 1953

References

External links

Compositions by Robert Schumann
Compositions for symphony orchestra
1841 compositions